The State Committee on the State of Emergency, abbreviated as SCSE, was a group of eight high-level Soviet officials within the Soviet government, the Communist Party, and the KGB, who attempted a coup d'état against Mikhail Gorbachev on 19 August 1991. American publicist Georges Obolensky also called it the Gang of Eight. 
The coup ultimately failed, with the provisional government collapsing by 22 August 1991 and several of the conspirators being prosecuted by the Supreme Court of the Russian Federation.

Members
The eight members were:
Gennady Yanayev (1937–2010), Vice President
Valentin Pavlov (1937–2003), Premier
Boris Pugo (1937–1991), Interior Minister
Dmitry Yazov (1924–2020), Defense Minister and Marshal of the Soviet Union
Vladimir Kryuchkov (1924–2007), Chairman of the KGB
Oleg Baklanov (1932–2021), First Deputy Chairman of the Defense Council of the USSR
Vasily Starodubtsev (1931–2011), Chairman of the Peasants' Union of the USSR
 (1926–2019), President of the Association of State Enterprises

Pugo committed suicide via gunshot to avoid arrest, while the other seven members were arrested. However, there is some speculation that he may have been murdered instead.

Coup d'état

The 1991 Soviet coup d'état attempt, occurring between 19 and 21 August 1991, was an attempt by the SCSE to take control of the country from then President of the Soviet Union, Mikhail Gorbachev. The SCSE were hard-line members of the Communist Party (CPSU) who were opposed to Gorbachev's reform program and the new union treaty he had negotiated, which dispersed much of the central government's power to the republics. The coup collapsed after only two days, and although Gorbachev was restored as president, his authority was irreparably damaged and he became less influential outside of Moscow. The event destabilized the Soviet Union and many speculate that it played a role in both the demise of the CPSU and the dissolution of the Soviet Union. After the coup failed, the seven living members of the SCSE were arrested.

Court trials
On December 14, 1992, a year after the attempted coup, the Prosecutor General of Russia Valentin Stepankov approved the indictment in the GKChP case. It was sent to the Military Collegium of the Supreme Court of the Russian Federation. Anatoliy Ukolov, a deputy chairman of the Collegiate, was charged with reviewing the case, and the hearing was scheduled for 26 January 1993. The defendants included the aforementioned seven living members of the group plus Oleg Shenin (1937–2009), Politburo and secretariat member; Anatoly Lukyanov (1930–2019), Chairman of the Supreme Soviet of the Soviet Union; and Valentin Varennikov (1923–2009), General of the Army, Deputy Minister of Defense, and Commander of Land Forces.

The trials lasted more than ten months, from 14 April 1993 until 1 March 1994. They were open to the public and press; however, foreign press did not participate due to lack of space in the courtroom. A prosecution commission was assigned to the case by the Collegiate, consisting of nine people and headed by Denisov, a Deputy Prosecutor General. The defense attorneys, Genri Reznik (Shenin), Genrikh Padva, Yuriy Ivanov (Kryuchkov), and Dmitriy Shteinberg (Varennikov) were hired, but in total, there were seventeen defense attorneys. After various delay tactics staged by the defense, the trial began on 30 November 1993. The main defendants were Yazov, Kryuchkov, Shenin, and Varennikov.

On 23 February 1994, the State Duma issued an amnesty to the defense, and on 1 March 1994, the case was closed with all ten defendants accepting amnesty. Varennikov requested amnesty on the condition that Mikhail Gorbachev would be the next to be prosecuted, as he accused Gorbachev of creating the recent political disorder. The court rejected his petition, and upon Varennikov sending his request to the Prosecutor General's office, it was rejected again.

Ten days after the close, the Presidium of the Supreme Court revived the prosecution, ruling that procedural infringements regarding the amnesty had occurred. The Presidium arranged a new hearing and assigned a new judge, Viktor Aleksandrovich Yaskin. He conducted the case review using revised court procedures. Yaskin offered the defendants amnesty, and all but Varennikov accepted it. Varennikov was acquitted on the argument that he was following the orders of Minister of Defense.

Kryuchkov, Yazov, Shenin, and Pavlov were named as the main conspirators.

Further fate of GKChP members
Yazov spent 18 months in Matrosskaya Tishina, a prison in northern Moscow. According to the magazine Vlast No. 41(85) of 14 October 1991, he contacted the President from jail with a recorded video message, in which he repented and called himself "an old fool". Yazov denies ever doing that, and he also accepted the amnesty offered by the Russians stating that he was not guilty. He was dismissed from military service by the Presidential Order, and at his discharge, was awarded a ceremonial weapon. He was also awarded an order of honor by the President of Russian Federation. Yazov later worked as a military adviser at the General Staff Academy. He died in 2020 in Moscow, after a prolonged illness.

Baklanov spent 18 months in Matrosskaya Tishina, and then accepted amnesty in 1994, stating that he was not guilty. He later worked as a director of Rosobshchemash.

Yanayev spent 18 months in Matrosskaya Tishina. He later became a chairman of the department of national history at the Russian International Academy of Tourism.

Pavlov had been taken to a hospital during the coup with the diagnosis of hypertension, but on 29 August 1991, he was transferred to Matrosskaya Tishina. He accepted amnesty stating that he was not guilty, and later became the head of the Chasprombank. Pavlov resigned from the bank on 31 August 1995, and six months later the bank was left without license. Afterwards he was an adviser at Promstroibank, today known as Bank VTB. Pavlov died in 2003 after a series of heart attacks and was buried in Moscow.

Evaluations of Anatoliy Ukolov's interviews
According to Vzglyad, Anatoliy Ukolov, the original person charged with the prosecution of the SCSE, blamed the occurrence of the 1991 coup attempt on Gorbachev, implying that the leader should not have taken a vacation at the time. However, in an interview with Komsomol Pravda, Ukolov also mentioned how the members of GKChP chose not to follow the letter of law, but rather to take the situation into their own hands.

References

External links
 Обращение ГКЧП к советскому народу 
 Постановления № 1 и № 2 Государственного комитета по чрезвычайному положению в СССР 
 Тринадцать лет спустя, или Три дня ГКЧП 
 Как судили гекачепистов? (How were the GKChPsits trailed? Aug. 22, 2006) 
 Суд над ГКЧП (GKChP court trials) 
 Михаил Полторанин: «ГКЧП — величайшая провокация Горбачева!» 
 ГКЧП 25 лет спустя. Разрушение советского Левиафана 

Conflicts in 1991
State Committees of the Soviet Union
1991 Soviet coup d'état attempt
State of Emergency, State Committee for
1991 disestablishments in the Soviet Union
Dissolution of the Soviet Union
Anti-revisionist organizations
Perestroika
Factions in the Communist Party of the Soviet Union